Voorhees is a surname. Its origins can be traced to Dutch settler Steven van Voorhees, who was from a village in Drenthe, Netherlands.

Notable people with the name include:

Alan Voorhees (1922–2005), American transportation engineer
Andrew Vorhees (born 1999), American football player
Charles Stewart Voorhees (1853–1909), American lawyer and politician
Clark Voorhees (1871–1933), American landscape painter
Daniel Voorhees (disambiguation), multiple people, including:
Daniel W. Voorhees (1827–1897), American lawyer and politician from Indiana
Daniel S. Voorhees (1913–possibly 2004), confessed to the 1947 murder of Elizabeth Short
Daniel Spader Voorhees (1852–1935), American politician from New Jersey 
Debi Sue Voorhees (born 1961), American actress
Donald Voorhees (disambiguation), multiple people, including:
Donald Voorhees (conductor) (1903–1989), American composer and conductor 
Donald E. Voorhees (born 1930), American politician from Iowa
Donald S. Voorhees (1916–1989), American judge
Ellen Voorhees (born 1958), American computer scientist
Erik Voorhees (born 1985), American entrepreneur
Foster McGowan Voorhees (1856–1927), American politician, governor of New Jersey
Lark Voorhies, American actress known, Lisa in Saved by the Bell
Lida Voorhees (1864–1934), American tennis player
Richard Lesley Voorhees (born 1941), American judge
Steven C. Voorhees (born c. 1955), American business executive
Steven van Voorhees (1600–1684), Dutch colonial magistrate, founder of a Dutch Reformed Church
Tracy Voorhees (1890–1974), American Under Secretary of the U.S. Army
Vern Voorhees (1878–1934), American politician from Michigan

Fictional characters
Jason Voorhees, a killer in the Friday the 13th franchise
Pamela Voorhees, Jason's mother and a killer in the Friday the 13th franchise
Klaus Voorhees, Marvel Comics supervillain
Curtis Vorhees, from The Passage
Nitia Vorhees, from The Passage
 Jacqueline Voorhees, from Unbreakable Kimmy Schmidt
 Megan Voorhees, a minor character in Scary Movie 2
 Xanthippe Lannister Voorhees, from Unbreakable Kimmy Schmidt
 Dr. Voorhees in The Thing from Another World

See also
Voorhies (disambiguation)
Voris

References

Dutch-language surnames